This list is of Japanese structures dating from the Kamakura period (1185-1333) that have been designated Important Cultural Properties (including *National Treasures).

Structures

Early Kamakura period
91 properties with 97 component structures.

Late Kamakura period
196 properties

See also

 Cultural Properties of Japan
 Japanese Buddhist architecture
 List of Important Cultural Properties of Japan (Heian period: structures)

References

Important Cultural Properties of Japan
Architecture in Japan